Molodohvardiisk (translit. Molodogvardeysk) is a city in southeastern Ukraine. It is located in the Krasnodon Municipality in Dovzhansk Raion of Luhansk Oblast (region).

History 

Previous settlements at this location were called Sotsmistechko in the 1950s, and Atamanivka in the 1940s. Molodohvardiisk was originally established in 1955, named after the Young Guard resistance group. It was granted city status in 1961.

In January 1989 the population of the city was 31 766 people.

In 2013 the population of the city was 23 332 people.

Since 2014, Molodohvardiisk has been controlled by the Luhansk People's Republic and not by Ukrainian authorities.

Demographics 
Native language as of the Ukrainian Census of 2001:
Russian  88.6%
Ukrainian  10.9%
Belarusian  0.2%

Facilities 
The town has three comprehensive education schools, a music school, an art school, and a cultural center "Dom Kultury" ("Culture House").

References 

Cities in Luhansk Oblast
Populated places established in the Ukrainian Soviet Socialist Republic
Populated places established in 1955
Cities of district significance in Ukraine
Soviet toponymy in Ukraine
1955 establishments in Ukraine